The anal valves are small valve-like folds at the lower ends of the anal sinuses in the rectum. The anal valves join the lower ends of the anal columns. The anal sinuses are located between them. The valves and sinuses form the pectinate line.

See also
 Anal canal

References

External links
  — "The Female Pelvis: The Rectum"

Digestive system